Platyomus is a genus of broad-nosed weevils in the family of beetles known as Curculionidae. There are at least 40 described species in Platyomus.

Species
These 46 species belong to the genus Platyomus:

 Platyomus agonista Germar, 1824 c g
 Platyomus angustifrons Voss, 1934 c g
 Platyomus atrosignatus Lucas, 1857 c g
 Platyomus auromaculatus (Voss, 1932) c g
 Platyomus besckei Germar, 1824 c g
 Platyomus bruchi Hustache, 1926 c g
 Platyomus cauirostris Boheman, 1840 c g
 Platyomus chrysopus Champion, 1911 c g
 Platyomus crassicornis Lucas, 1857 c g
 Platyomus dianae Boheman, 1840 c g
 Platyomus duponti Boheman, 1833 c g
 Platyomus effusus Pascoe, 1880 c g
 Platyomus elegantulus Hustache, 1923 c g
 Platyomus eustaloides Champion, 1911 c g
 Platyomus eximius (Voss, 1932) c g
 Platyomus fasciatus Boheman, 1840 c g
 Platyomus flexicaulis (Schaffer, 1905) c g b (ebony broad-nosed weevil)
 Platyomus geminus Champion, 1911 c g
 Platyomus gratiosus Champion, 1911 c g
 Platyomus gyllenhali Boheman, 1840 c g
 Platyomus humilis Erichson, 1847 c g
 Platyomus hystricosus Germar, 1824 c g
 Platyomus latacungae Kirsch, 1889 c g
 Platyomus macroscapus Champion, 1911 c g
 Platyomus marmomtus Marshall, 1922 c g
 Platyomus mollis Faust, 1890 c g
 Platyomus nigroguttatus Champion, 1911 c g
 Platyomus nodipennis Sahlberg, 1823 c g
 Platyomus ochraceus Hustache, 1938 c g
 Platyomus perlepidus Boheman, 1833 c g
 Platyomus piscatorius Germar, 1824 c g
 Platyomus planicollis Hustache, 1926 c g
 Platyomus prasinus Boheman, 1833 c g
 Platyomus sellatus Marshall, 1922 c g
 Platyomus septempunctatus Boheman, 1833 c g
 Platyomus signatus Rosenschoeld, 1840 c g
 Platyomus silbermanni Rosenschoeld, 1840 c g
 Platyomus squaminasus Champion, 1925 c g
 Platyomus transversesignatus Boheman, 1840 c g
 Platyomus tripunctatus Kirsch, 1874 c g
 Platyomus undulatus Boheman, 1833 c g
 Platyomus vermiculatus Hustache, 1938 c g
 Platyomus viridis Voss, 1934 c g
 Platyomus wahlenbergi Boheman, 1840 c g
 Platyomus wellsi Rheinheimer, 2007 c g
 Platyomus zebra Champion, 1911 c g

Data sources: i = ITIS, c = Catalogue of Life, g = GBIF, b = Bugguide.net

References

Further reading

External links

 

Entiminae